Paul Harkin (born 8 March 1958) is an English former professional rugby league footballer who played in the 1970s, 1980s and 1990s, and coached in the 1990s.

Background
Paul Harkin's birth was registered in Wakefield district, West Riding of Yorkshire, England.

Playing career

Hull Kingston Rovers
In December 1978, Harkin was sold to Hull Kingston Rovers in exchange for Len Casey.

During the 1980–81 season, Harkin played  in Hull Kingston Rovers' 7–8 defeat by Leeds in the 1980–81 Yorkshire Cup Final at Fartown Ground, Huddersfield on Saturday 8 November 1980, and played  in Hull Kingston Rovers' 9–18 defeat by Widnes in the 1980–81 Challenge Cup Final at Wembley Stadium, London on Saturday 2 May 1981, in front of a crowd of 92,496. 

Harkin played  (replaced by substitute Chris Burton) in Hull Kingston Rovers' 4–12 defeat by Hull F.C. in the 1981–82 John Player Trophy Final during the 1981–82 season at Headingley, Leeds on Saturday 23 January 1982.

In April 1983, he spent a month on loan at Featherstone Rovers.

During the 1984–85 season, Harkin played  (replaced by substitute Chris Rudd) in the 12–29 defeat by Hull F.C. in the 1984–85 Yorkshire Cup Final  at Boothferry Park, Kingston upon Hull on Saturday 27 October 1984, and played , and was man of the match in the 12–0 victory over Hull F.C. in the 1984–85 John Player Special Trophy Final at Boothferry Park, Kingston upon Hull on Saturday 26 January 1985.

During the 1985–86 season, Harkin played  in the 22–18 victory over Castleford in the 1985–86 Yorkshire Cup Final at Headingley, Leeds on Sunday 27 October 1985, played , and was man of the match in the 8–11 defeat by Wigan in the 1985–86 John Player Special Trophy Final at Elland Road, Leeds on Saturday 11 January 1986, and played  in the 14–15 defeat by Castleford in the 1985–86 Challenge Cup Final at Wembley Stadium, London, on Saturday 3 May 1986, in front of a crowd of 82,134.

Bradford Northern
In March 1987, Harkin returned to Bradford Northern, signing for a transfer fee of around £40,000.

In the 1987–88 season, Harkin played  and was man of the match (winning the White Rose Trophy) in Bradford Northern's 12–12 draw with Castleford in the 1987–88 Yorkshire Cup Final at Headingley, Leeds on Saturday 17 October 1987, and played  in the 11–2 victory over Castleford in the replay at Elland Road, Leeds on Saturday 31 October 1987

He played , scored 2-tries, and was awarded the White Rose Trophy for the second time in the 20–14 victory over Featherstone Rovers in the 1989–90 Yorkshire Cup Final during the 1989–90 season at Headingley, Leeds on Sunday 5 November 1989.

Later career
Harkin signed for Leeds in June 1990. The transfer fee was set at £65,000 by an independent tribunal. He left the club a year later, joining Halifax for a fee of £30,000.

In August 1992, Harkin was transfer listed by Halifax following the signing of Paul Bishop, and was eventually sold to Hunslet, where he finished his playing career.

International honours
Harkin won a cap for Great Britain while at Hull Kingston Rovers in 1985 against France.

Coaching career
Harkin coached Wakefield Trinity between January 1995 and January 1996.

He later joined the coaching staff at Bradford Bulls.

Family
Harkin is the younger brother of Terry Harkin, and the cousin of Kevin P. Harkin, both rugby league footballers.

References

External links
Photograph "Harkin on the burst" at rlhp.co.uk
Photograph "Paul Harkin scores" at rlhp.co.uk
Photograph "Paul Harkin grubber" at rlhp.co.uk
(archived by web.archive.org) The Millennium Masters - Backs
Photos at flickr.com
Dobson keen to learn quick and help make a difference
(archived by web.archive.org) Rally Round the Robins
Rugby League: Keighley pack in the points: Wasyliw on target
League of Their Own
(archived by web.archive.org) Injury prompts retirement

1958 births
Living people
Bradford Bulls players
English rugby league coaches
English rugby league players
Featherstone Rovers players
Great Britain national rugby league team players
Halifax R.L.F.C. players
Hull Kingston Rovers players
Hunslet R.L.F.C. players
Leeds Rhinos players
Rugby league players from Wakefield
Rugby league halfbacks
Wakefield Trinity coaches